Abdellatief Abouheif (January 30, 1929 – April 23, 2008) was an Egyptian marathon swimming champion. He was educated at Eton College and the Sandhurst Military Academy, where he graduated in 1956. He was the 1964, 1965, and 1968 World Professional Marathon Swimming Federation Champion.  He also was recognized as the Marathon Swimmer of the Century by the International Swimming Hall of Fame in 2001.

See also
 List of members of the International Swimming Hall of Fame

References

External links
 Abdel-Lattif Abu-Heif (1929-2008) at Egyptian Figures.
 Abdellatief Abouheif at abouheif.com.

1929 births
2008 deaths
Egyptian male swimmers
Sportspeople from Alexandria
People educated at Eton College
20th-century Egyptian people
21st-century Egyptian people